Hog Jaw may refer to:

Hog Jaw, Arkansas, place in Montgomery County, Arkansas, United States
Hog Jaw, Alabama, place in Marshall County, Alabama, United States